Reel to Reel is the debut solo studio album by American rapper Grand Puba. It was released on October 20, 1992 through Elektra Records. Recording sessions took place at Power Play Studios in Long Island City, at Chung King House of Metal and at The Hit Factory in New York. Production was handled primarily by Grand Puba, along with Stimulated Dummies, Anthony Latief King, DJ Shabazz, Kid Capri and The Brand New Heavies.

The album peaked at number 28 on the Billboard 200 and at number 14 on the Top R&B/Hip-Hop Albums in the United States.

The album was preceded by two charted singles: "360° (What Goes Around)" and "Check It Out". Its lead single, "360° (What Goes Around)", reached #68 on the Billboard Hot 100, #30 on the Hot R&B/Hip-Hop Songs and #1 on the Hot Rap Songs. The second single, "Check It Out" featuring Mary J. Blige, made it to #85 on the Hot R&B/Hip-Hop Songs and #13 on the Hot Rap Songs. The album's third single, "Ya Know How It Goes", was released on June 17, 1993 and did not make it to any Billboard charts.

Track listing

Personnel
Maxwell Dixon – vocals, producer (tracks: 1, 2, 4-9, 11-13), mixing
Mary Jane Blige – vocals (track 4)
Anton Pukshansky – bass (track 2)
Roland Parkins – bass & guitar (track 6)
Clarence Stanley – producer (track 3)
John 'Geeby' Dajani – producer (tracks: 6, 7), re-mixing (track 14)
John Gamble – producer & engineering (tracks: 6, 7), re-mixing (track 14)
Dante Ross – producer (tracks: 6, 7), re-mixing (track 14), executive producer
Anthony Latief King – producer (track 10)
David Anthony Love, Jr. – producer (track 12)
Andrew Levy – producer (track 15)
Jan Kincaid – producer (track 15)
Simon Bartholomew – producer (track 15)
Orlando Aguillen – co-producer (track 15)
Rob Sutton – engineering (tracks: 1-4, 8, 13)
Vaughn Sessions – engineering (tracks: 5, 9-13)
Showtyme – assistant engineering (tracks: 3, 5, 8-12)
Jack Hersca – assistant engineering (tracks: 6, 7)
Herb Powers, Jr. – mastering
Carol Bobolts – design
Mark Seliger – photography

Charts

References

External links

1992 debut albums
Grand Puba albums
Elektra Records albums
Albums produced by Dante Ross
Albums produced by John Gamble (record producer)
Albums recorded at Chung King Studios